Sir Charles Douglas Wiggin  (26 September 1922 – 8 March 1977) was a British diplomat who was ambassador to Spain.

Career
Charles Douglas Wiggin was educated at Eton College and Christ Church, Oxford. He served in the Royal Air Force Volunteer Reserve during World War II, then joined the Diplomatic Service in 1946. Between posts at the Foreign Office (later the Foreign and Commonwealth Office, FCO) he served at the embassies in Santiago, Stockholm, Tehran and Washington, D.C. He was private secretary to Edward Heath, who was Lord Privy Seal and deputy Foreign Secretary, 1961–63 and briefly to Lord Carrington in 1963. He then attended the Imperial Defence College, served again at Tehran and as head of department at the FCO, and finally as ambassador to Spain 1974–77.

Wiggin was appointed CMG in 1968 and knighted KCMG during his posting to Spain.

Family
In 1948 Wiggin married Marie Thérèse Elizabeth Leche in Santiago, Chile, where her father, Sir John Leche, was British ambassador at the time. They had three daughters.

Through his mother, Carmen Fernandez Vallin y Parrella, Wiggin inherited the title of Marqués de Muros (Muros de Nalón, Asturias, Spain, where he was born).

Honours and awards
On 3 March 1944 Acting Flight Lieutenant Charles Douglas Wiggin of No. 44 Squadron RAF was awarded the Distinguished Flying Cross:

References

WIGGIN, Sir Charles (Douglas), Who Was Who, A & C Black, 1920–2008; online edn, Oxford University Press, Dec 2012
Sir Charles Wiggin (obituary), The Times, London, 11 March 1977, page 20

1922 births
Graduates of the Royal College of Defence Studies
1977 deaths
People educated at Eton College
Alumni of Christ Church, Oxford
British expatriates in the United States
British expatriates in Sweden
British expatriates in Chile
British expatriates in Iran
Royal Air Force Volunteer Reserve personnel of World War II
Ambassadors of the United Kingdom to Spain
Knights Commander of the Order of St Michael and St George
Recipients of the Distinguished Flying Cross (United Kingdom)
Recipients of the Air Force Cross (United Kingdom)
Marquesses of Spain
Royal Air Force officers
Royal Air Force pilots of World War II
British World War II bomber pilots